Andrew Stephan Pessoa (born October 30, 1995) is an American actor.  His first leading role was in the 2006 independent short film Fishy, which was directed by Laurie Epstein.  His current projects include Adventures in Odyssey, Transformers: Prime, and Bucket & Skinner's Epic Adventures.

Background 
Andy Pessoa was born in Kearney, Nebraska, as fourth son to David and Stephanie Pessoa.  He has three brothers: Samuel, Joshua, and Jeremy.  He currently resides in Los Angeles, California.  Besides Los Angeles, cities in which Andy has lived include: Norton, Kansas; Bloomington, Minnesota; Cannon Falls, Minnesota; Arlington, Texas, and Los Alamitos, California.  Andy relocated to California and began acting in early 2005.

Filmography

Film

Television

Radio

Video games

References

External links 
 
 Andy Pessoa at The Adventures in Odyssey Wiki
 Andy Pessoa at The Odyssey Library
 Andy Pessoa Online

1995 births
Living people
Male actors from Nebraska
American male child actors
American male film actors
American male television actors
American male voice actors
21st-century American male actors
People from Kearney, Nebraska